The 2008 Gulf Air Desert 400 was the twelfth round of the 2008 V8 Supercar season. It was held on the weekend of the 6 to 8 November at the Bahrain International Circuit in Bahrain.

Qualifying 
Qualifying was held on Friday 7 November 2008.

Race 1
Race 1 was held on Friday 7 November 2008. Whincup leapt away while a fierce dice erupted between Lowndes, Todd Kelly and Tander. A forceful move on the second lap saw Kelly muscle his way past Lowndes and Tander. Steven Johnson slipped into third behind Kelly as Tander and Lowndes were slow away from the hairpin. Further back in the pack a tangle saw Michael Patrizi and Mark Skaife spun backwards, also tangling with Michael Caruso, Jason Richards and Andrew Thompson, bringing out the safety car. Skaife, Richards and Patrizi had too much damage to continue.

At the restart Steven Johnson clawed into second briefly before dropping back behind Kelly again. Lowndes took third from Johnson. Lap 9 saw Whincup, Kelly, James Courtney and Russell Ingall to put of the front runners. The following lap saw Lowndes, Tander, Will Davison and Mark Winterbottom. A slow stop and exit saw Lowndes leap frog Kelly into second place. Tander moved into fourth ahead of Courtney while Davison pulled over at pit exit, overcome by fumes. Fabian Coulthard spun into the turn 4 sand trap after contact from Jason Bright, for which Bright later was given a drive-through penalty. The resultant safety car triggered Johnson's pit stop from the lead with Rick Kelly and Steven Richards also stopping.

At the restart Whincup, Lowndes and Todd Kelly leapt away while further back in the field on the second lap contact between Tander and Winterbottom saw Tander spun in front of the pack. Tander dropped to the tail of the field while Winterbottom was assigned a drive-through penalty. Coulthard stopped out on the track trying to limp a car home with a punctured front right tyre and Patrizi spun Jack Perkins around.

Paul Morris briefly held fourth on pit stop strategy but soon lost places to Lee Holdsworth, Courtney and team-mate Ingall. Todd Kelly was controversially given a drive-through penalty, taking away his, and the team's, best result of the season, for over-taking the safety car at its second deployment.

Team Vodafone continued on to claim a race 1-2, ahead of Holdsworth, Ingall, Courtney, Johnson, Shane van Gisbergen, Steven Richards, Rick Kelly and Greg Murphy.

Race 2 
Race 2 was held on Saturday 8 November 2008. Whincup leap away with Ingall in pursuit ahead of battling pair Courtney and Lowndes with Johnson. Holdsworth overtook Van Gisbergen for sixth.

Paul Dumbrell spun on the second lap after contact with Michael Caruso. Local Bahraini guest driver Fahad Al Musalem stopped with a broken gearbox in the Team Kiwi Ford. Andrew Thompson spun and stopped at turn 1 after the right rear tyre delaminated, triggering a safety car.

At the restart Whincup led from Ingall, Lowndes, Courtney, Holdsworth, Richards, Johnson and Winterbottom. Richards pounced on Holdsworth at turn 1 while further Todd Kelly picked off a few cars including Garth Tander. Van Gisbergen was smoking at the front left corner tyre rubbing after contact Van Gisbergen lost control, hitting Jack Perkins and spinning Rick Kelly. Van Gisbergen later received a drive-through penalty.

A fierce dice between Courtney and Winterbottom saw the Ford Performance Racing driver move into fourth place on lap 23, the following lap Steven Richards got Courtney as well, with Holdsworth and Todd Kelly closing behind. The dice between those three became hard fought with Courtney suffering for tyre grip but still plenty of power with Will Davison joining the fight by lap 26.

Whincup raced on to win from Ingall, Lowndes, Winterbottom, Richards, Todd Kelly, Courtney, Johnson, Morris and Davison.

Race 3
Race 3 was held on Saturday 8 November 2008. Russell Ingall led from the start, fighting with Jamie Whincup for the lead with Lowndes and Winterbottom fighting for third. 

Third lap into the first corner and Steven Johnson ran into the back of Todd Kelly, spinning the Jack Daniels Commodore. Will Davison ran into his team-mate Johnson. Jason Bright and Mark Skaife made contact with Skaife then hitting his teammate Garth Tander. Skaife was out on the spot with Tander pitting for a new right rear tyre.

At the restart Ingall again overtook Whincup. Whincup later retook the lead prior to the beginning of the compulsory pit stops.

During the stops Craig Lowndes was able to get the better of Mark Winterbottom for what would become third position. Safety was called for Todd Kelly's expired Commodore, the car stopped on the circuit

Rick Kelly and Cameron McConville made contact and spun while the bunched field at the restart allowed James Courtney to pass Winterbottom, then move into third by taking advantage of a slow-out-of-the-corner Russell Ingall who had just lost second to Lowndes. On lap 25 Courtney pounced on Lowndes and brakes for second. Lap 28 saw Winterbottom take fourth from Ingall.

Whincup pulled clear of Courtney who by race end had to defend from Lowndes. The result saw the first ever 1-2 finish for Team Vodafone. Fifth spot behind Winterbottom was enough for Russell Ingall to claim third for the round, the best Holden driver for the weekend.

Results

Qualifying

Standings
After round 12 of 14.

Support categories
The 2008 Desert 400 of the V8 Supercar Championship had three support categories.

References

External links
Official timing and results

Gulf Air Desert 400
Gulf Air Desert 400